Ready for the Weekend may refer to:

 Ready for the Weekend (album), a 2009 album by Calvin Harris
 "Ready for the Weekend" (song), the title track
 "Ready for the Weekend", a 2012 song by Icona Pop from Icona Pop
 "Ready for the Weekend", a 2014 song by R3hab and NERVO
 "Ready for the Weekend?", a feature on The Scott Mills Show on BBC Radio 1